Dorothy Elizabeth Harrison (born 16 March 1950) is a retired English international swimmer.

Swimming career
She represented Great Britain in the Olympic Games and European championships and won a bronze medal in the 200-metre breaststroke at the 1970 European Aquatics Championships.  She competed in five breaststroke and medley relay events at the 1968 and 1972 Summer Olympics; her best achievements were sixth place in the 4×100-metre medley relay in 1968 and eighth place in the 100-metre breaststroke in 1972. In the medley relay she competed with Margaret Auton, Wendy Burrell and Alexandra Jackson.

She also represented England and won three silver medals in the 100 and 200 metres breaststroke events and the 4 x 100 metres medley relay, at the 1970 British Commonwealth Games in Edinburgh, Scotland.

At the ASA National British Championships she won the 100 metres breaststroke title in 1971  and the 220 yards/200 metres breaststroke titles in 1969, 1970 and 1971.

References

1950 births
Living people
Swimmers at the 1968 Summer Olympics
Swimmers at the 1972 Summer Olympics
Olympic swimmers of Great Britain
Female breaststroke swimmers
European Aquatics Championships medalists in swimming
Swimmers at the 1970 British Commonwealth Games
Commonwealth Games medallists in swimming
Commonwealth Games silver medallists for England
Medallists at the 1970 British Commonwealth Games